Ashbury Railway Carriage and Iron Co Ltd v Riche (1875) LR 7 HL 653 is a UK company law case, which concerned the objects clause of a company's memorandum of association.

Its importance as case law has been diminished as a result of the Companies Act 2006 s 31, which allows for unlimited objects for which a company may be carried on. Furthermore, any limits a company does have in its objects clause have no effect whatsoever for people outside a company (s 39 CA 2006), except as a general issue of authority of the company's agents.

Facts
Incorporated under the Companies Act 1862, the Ashbury Railway Carriage and Iron Company Ltd’s memorandum, clause 3, stated that its objects were "to make and sell, or lend on hire, railway-carriages…" and clause 4 stated that activities beyond this needed a special resolution. But the company agreed to give Riche and his brother a loan to build a railway from Antwerp to Tournai in Belgium. Later, the company repudiated the agreement. Riche sued, and the company pleaded that the action was ultra vires.

Judgment

Exchequer Court
The judges of the exchequer chamber being equally divided, the decision of the court below was affirmed.

Blackburn J said:

House of Lords
The House of Lords, agreeing with the three dissentient judges in the Exchequer Chamber, pronounced the effect of the Companies Act to be the opposite of that indicated by Mr Justice Blackburn. It held that if a company pursues objects beyond the scope of the memorandum of association, the company's actions are ultra vires and void. Lord Cairns LC said,

References

United Kingdom company case law
Lord Blackburn cases
1875 in case law
1875 in British law
House of Lords cases
Railway litigation in 1875